Sir Iqbal Abdul Karim Mussa Sacranie, OBE (born 6 September 1951 in Malawi) served as Secretary General of the Muslim Council of Britain (MCB) until June 2006. He arrived in the UK in 1969. He was the founding Secretary General of the Muslim Council of Britain (established 1997), and served four further years as Secretary General from 2002 to 2004 and 2004 to 2006. He was honoured with an Officer of the Order of the British Empire (OBE) in 1999, and was Knighted by the Queen in 2005.

During the controversy on Salman Rushdie, shortly after the fatwa by Iranian religious leader Ayatollah Khomeini for his book The Satanic Verses, Sacranie stated: "Death, perhaps, is a bit too easy for him his mind must be tormented for the rest of his life unless he asks for forgiveness to Almighty Allah." Sacranie states that this quotation was misinterpreted and that he merely wanted to convince Muslims that they should not kill Rushdie.

On 3 January 2006 Sacranie told BBC Radio 4's PM programme that he believes homosexuality is "not acceptable", and denounced same-sex civil partnerships as "harmful". He said that bringing in gay marriage did "not augur well" for building the foundations of society.

He was Chairman of Muslim Aid and since 2012 is on the executive committee.

See also 

Islam in the United Kingdom
Festival of Muslim Cultures

Notes

1951 births
Malawian Muslims
Living people
British Muslims
Islam-related controversies in Europe
Malawian emigrants to the United Kingdom
British people of Indian descent
Knights Bachelor
Officers of the Order of the British Empire
Malawian people of Indian descent
Memon people